On 8 February 1986, twenty-three people were killed in a collision between a Canadian National Railway freight train and a Via Rail passenger train called the Super Continental, including the engine crews of both trains.  It was the deadliest rail disaster in Canada since the Dugald accident of 1947, which had thirty-one fatalities, and was not surpassed until the Lac-Mégantic rail disaster in 2013, which resulted in 47 deaths.

After 56 days of testimony at a public inquiry, a commission concluded that the collision was caused by the freight head end crew failing to stop their train because of incapacitation or other unknown factors, while the conductor in the caboose failed to use the emergency brake to stop the train. The report also highlighted serious flaws in the culture and safety practices at Canadian National Railway.

Background
The collision occurred on a stretch of Canadian National Railway's transcontinental main line west of Edmonton, near the town of Hinton, Alberta.  The towns of Jasper to the west and Edson to the east were nearby.  Slightly over half of the  stretch of track between Jasper and Edson was double-tracked, including  of trackage from Hargwen control point west to Dalehurst control point.  Traffic on this line was controlled with Centralized Traffic Control (CTC).

Passenger train

On the morning of 8 February 1986, Via Rail Canada train No. 4 was traveling eastbound from Jasper to Edmonton on its transcontinental journey. The train, which combined Super Continental and Skeena, consisted of 14 units in the following order:
FP7 Diesel locomotive number 6566
F9B Diesel locomotive number 6633
Baggage-Dormitory 617
Coach-Snack Bar 3229
Skyline Dome car number 513
4-8-4 Sleeping car 1139 Ennishore
4-8-4 Sleeping car 1120 Elcott
FP9ARM Diesel locomotive number 6300 (inoperative)
Steam generator car 15445
Baggage car 9653
Daynighter Coach 5703
Cafe-Lounge 757
4-8-4 Sleeping car 1150 Estcourt
Steam generator car 15404
The train's unusual composition was the result of two separate scheduled services from British Columbia being coupled together at Jasper.  The front section, which had originated in Vancouver, consisted of two locomotives and five cars while the second (rear) section from Prince Rupert was led by one locomotive and five cars. A steam generator was coupled to the end of the train at Jasper for transfer to Edmonton depot for maintenance.

Engineers Mike Peleshaty, age 57, and Emil Miller, age 53, were in the lead locomotive. On board the train were 94 passengers, 14 stewards and 7 crew (115 total).

Freight train

Canadian National Railway's westbound train No. 413 consisted of three locomotives, EMD GP38-2W number 5586, and 2 EMD SD40 numbers 5104 and 5062, followed by a high-speed spreader, 35 cylindrical hoppers loaded with grain, 7 bulkhead flat cars loaded with large pipes, 45 hoppers loaded with sulphur, 20 loaded tank cars, 6 more grain cars, and a caboose; a total consist of 3 locomotives and 115 cars. On the lead locomotive were engineer John Edward "Jack" Hudson, aged 48, and brakeman Mark Edwards, aged 25. On the caboose, conductor Wayne "Smitty" Smith, aged 33.

Collision
The freight train left Edson at 6:40 am. About  from Edson, it was halted at sidings outside Medicine Lodge to allow two eastbound trains to pass. It departed Medicine Lodge at 8:02 am and traveled , reaching Hargwen at 8:20 am where a section of double track started. The train dispatcher at Edmonton set the dual-control switch (DCS) so that the freight train took the north track.

At about the same time, the Super Continental was stopped at Hinton. It departed five minutes late on the single track. At 8:29 am, as the Super Continental approached the start of the double track section, the dispatcher from the CTC lined the dual-control switch at Dalehurst to the south track. This set the absolute three-aspect signal at the Dalehurst control point on the north line (about  before the end of double-track) to an absolute stop indication of three steady red lights, telling the freight train to not proceed any further.

No attempt was made by the crew of the freight train to slow down before or after passing the approach signal.

The freight train proceeded past the Dalehurst control point, running through the switch and into the section of single track. At 8:40 am, approximately 18 seconds after the lead locomotive of the freight train entered the single section, it collided head on with the oncoming Super Continental.

Both lead locomotives were destroyed, killing their crews. The front cars and freight wagons derailed. Diesel fuel from the locomotives ignited, engulfing them, the baggage car, and the day coach in flames; 18 of the day coach's 36 occupants died. Due to momentum, the cars on the freight train piled up on each other resulting in a large pile of debris. All three freight locomotives followed by 76 hoppers and tank cars were either destroyed or severely damaged.

On the passenger train, one coach was crushed by a freight car after it was thrown into the air by the force of the collision, killing one of its occupants.  In the dome car, others were able to escape either through a window in the dome that had been broken by passengers, or through the hole left by the freight car.  The two sleepers following the dome car jackknifed into each other and were thrown on their sides causing injuries but no deaths.  The mid train locomotive (6300) was severely damaged (It was repaired with a new cab section from a KCS EMD F7).) The last three passenger cars at the rear of the train did not derail, but there were many injuries.

After the rear of the freight train came to a halt, Conductor Smith, still in the caboose, attempted to contact the front of the train before contacting emergency services after seeing the fire.

Investigation
The Canadian government set up a Commission of Inquiry to investigate the crash. It was led by Justice René P. Foisy, then of Court of Queen's Bench of Alberta (subsequently of the Court of Appeal of Alberta). The inquiry lasted 56 days of public hearings and received evidence from 150 parties. The Foisy Commission published its full report on 22 January 1987.

The inquiry concluded that no one individual was to blame; instead it condemned what Foisy described as a "railroader culture" that prized loyalty and productivity at the expense of safety.  As an example of lax attitudes to safety, Foisy noted that engineering crews that took over trains at Edson did so "on the fly".  While the locomotive was moving slowly through the yard, the new crew would jump on and the previous crew would jump off.  While this method saved time and fuel, it was a flagrant violation of safety regulations which required stationary brake tests after a crew change.  Management claimed to be unaware of this practice, even though it was quite common. In regards to engineer John Hudson, the Foisy Commission concluded it was a possibility that the collision happened because he had either fallen asleep at the controls or had suffered a heart attack or stroke due to his extremely poor health.

The report highlighted that there was no evidence that either train made any attempt to brake prior to the collision. Analysis of the line showed both trains would have only been visible to each other for the final 19 seconds before the collision. No conclusive reason could be found for the failure of the passenger train crew to react, neither was there any evidence that the Super Continental crew had made any errors before the accident. No evidence could be found to explain why the freight train failed to stop at the absolute signal at the Dalehurst control point. After a wrong-side signal problem was eliminated, human error was considered the only possible cause. Tests on the crews' remains ruled out drugs or alcohol as a cause, though it was revealed that the engineer of the freight train, Jack Hudson, was an alcoholic and heavy smoker who suffered from pancreatitis and type 2 diabetes, thus placing him at risk for a heart attack or stroke.  The commission further criticized CN's ineffective monitoring of Hudson's health condition:

The serious nature of Hudson's medical condition...raises a strong possibility that it was a factor contributing to the collision of February 8...The Commission therefore concludes that engineer Hudson's medical condition possibly contributed to his failure to control Train 413. The Commission also concludes that there are serious deficiencies in the manner in which CN monitored and reacted to that condition. The Commission finds that both the policies and procedures that permitted a man in Hudson's medical state to be responsible for the operation of a freight train on the CN main line to be unacceptable.

Another frequently ignored safety regulation mentioned in the report was the "deadman's pedal", which a locomotive engineer had to keep depressed for the train to remain underway.  Were he to fall asleep or pass out, his foot would slip from the pedal, triggering an alarm and engaging the train's brakes automatically a few seconds later.  However, many engineers found this tiresome and bypassed the pedal by placing a heavy weight (often a worn out brake shoe) on it.  It was uncertain whether the pedal had been bypassed in this case because the lead locomotive of the train had been destroyed.  A more advanced safety device was available, the reset safety control (RSC), which required crew members to take an action such as pushing a button at regular intervals, or else automatic braking would occur, but neither lead locomotive was equipped with this safety feature.  While the second locomotive in the freight train was equipped with RSC, it was not assigned as the lead locomotive because it lacked a "comfort cab".  Management and union practice was to place more comfortable locomotives at the front of trains, even at the expense of safety.

The report also noted that although the front-end and rear-end crews should have been in regular communication, that did not appear to be the case in this accident.  As the freight train reached Hargwen, Engineer Hudson radioed back to Conductor Smith that the signals were green, a communication that was heard by a following freight.  As it ran towards Dalehurst there was no evidence of further communication.  The conductor is in charge of the train, so if Smith felt that the train was out of control or there were serious problems, he should have activated the emergency brake in the caboose to stop the train.  However, Smith, who appeared to be nervous while testifying, said that he did not feel that the freight was ever out of control, misjudging its speed. He also testified that he attempted to radio Hudson on two radios and several channels, but neither seemed to be working, even though immediately after the crash Smith was able to contact the dispatcher by radio. In any event, on the failure to receive communication from the head end, regulations required him to activate the emergency brake.

Aftermath 
Most of the rolling stock and almost all of the locomotives were damaged beyond economical repair from the collision, and they were subsequently sold for scrap. Only the inoperable Via Rail unit, FP9ARM 6300, was repaired after the collision. It returned to service following a rebuild with an entire new cab from a Kansas City Southern F7 locomotive 4062. It was the last FP9 in service on Via Rail before it was retired in September 2011, and it was subsequently acquired by the British Columbia Chapter of the National Railway Historical Society. As of 2022, 6300 resides at the Heber Valley Railroad in Heber City, Utah.

Dramatization
The disaster was featured in "Head-on Collision", a Season 3 (2005) Crash Scene Investigation episode of the Canadian TV series Mayday For broadcasters that do not use the series name Mayday, this is one of three Season 3 episodes labelled as Crash Scene Investigation spin-offs, examining marine or rail disasters.

Similar accidents 
 1987 Maryland train collision, in which a freight also disregarded signals and was rear-ended by an Amtrak passenger train at full speed; the crew of that freight was also found to have limited mental capacity due to marijuana use and had disabled safety features as well.
 2008 Chatsworth train collision, in which a Metrolink commuter train disregarded signals and collided head on with a Union Pacific freight train; the engineer of the commuter train was concluded to have been distracted by text messages.
 2018 Cayce, South Carolina train collision, in which misaligned switches caused an Amtrak passenger train to collide with a CSX freight train.

See also 

 List of rail accidents (1980–89)
 List of rail accidents in Canada

References

External links
 Foisy commission investigative report
 
 Clip from Head-On Collision

Hinton, Alberta
Railway accidents in 1986
Train collisions in Canada
1986 in Canada
Disasters in Alberta
Rail transport in Alberta
Yellowhead County
Railway accidents involving a signal passed at danger
Accidents and incidents involving Canadian National Railway
Accidents and incidents involving Via Rail
February 1986 events in Canada